Diego Campos Peiro (born 19 March 1988 in Guadalajara) is a former Mexican football forward who last played for Atlante in the Ascenso MX.

Career
Campos came up through Club Atlas's lower division under-17 and under-20 squads. He played for Académicos de Guadalajara in the Primera A in 2009. On Sunday June 8, 2011 he was transferred to Puebla F.C. after a few years in Club Atlas's first squad where he only played in eleven games.

References

External links

1985 births
Living people
Footballers from Guadalajara, Jalisco
Association football midfielders
Mexican footballers
Atlas F.C. footballers
Club Puebla players
Leones Negros UdeG footballers
Tecos F.C. footballers
Atlético San Luis footballers
Lobos BUAP footballers
Atlante F.C. footballers
Liga MX players